Walter Bennett (15 December 1918 – 2009) was an English footballer who played in the Football League for Barnsley, Doncaster Rovers and Halifax Town.

External links
 

English footballers
English Football League players
1918 births
2009 deaths
Barnsley F.C. players
Doncaster Rovers F.C. players
Halifax Town A.F.C. players
Association football forwards